Hemlock Public School District is a school district headquartered in Hemlock, Michigan. Its schools include Hemlock Elementary School, K.C. Ling Elementary School, Hemlock Middle School, and Hemlock High School.

The district was created in 1863 and is governed by a seven-member publicly elected board of education.

Notable alumni
 Quinn Nichols

References

External links

 Hemlock Public School District

School districts in Michigan
Saginaw Intermediate School District
1863 establishments in Michigan
School districts established in 1863